Zulu Wedding is a 2017 South African romantic comedy film produced, written and directed by Lineo Sekeleoane on her directorial debut. The film casts artists of South Africa, Nigeria and US. The film stars Nondumiso Tembe, Kelly Khumalo, Darrin Henson in the lead roles. The portions of the film were primarily shot in South Africa, New York and Botswana. The principal photography of the film underwent financial troubles especially when the production team announced its release date in 2017. The release was later postponed on 23 February 2018. The producer cleared the financial issues in mid 2019 and the film had its theatrical release on 11 October 2019.

Cast 

 Darrin Henson as Tex Wilson
 Nondumiso Tembe as Lu Sabata
 Carl Anthony Payne II as Nate
 Pallance Dladla as Zulu
 Makgano Mamabolo as Mabo
 Kgomotso Christopher as Rene
 Kelly Khumalo as Yvonne Sabata
 Bubu Mazibuko as Sam
 Lorcia Cooper as Marang

Synopsis 
A beautiful young dancer Lu Sabata (Nondumiso Tembe) who moves to US from her motherland South Africa in order to pursue her career in dancing, falls in love with Tex Wilson (Darrin Henson), a New York based man. However a complication is caused due to the family backgrounds of these two. Lu is from the royal Zulu family who is determined to fulfill her aspirations in the US has to bound by an ancestral debt to marry a Zulu royal family member.

References

External links 
 
 https://www.rottentomatoes.com/m/zulu_wedding

2017 films
2017 romantic comedy films
2017 directorial debut films
Films shot in South Africa
Films shot in Botswana
Films shot in the United States
South African romantic comedy films
English-language South African films
2010s English-language films